Lätäseno Leahttáseatnu (Northern Sami), is a river of Finland in Finnish Lapland. It is a tributary of Muonio River, which itself is a tributary of Torne River. The river is a popular fishing destination. It flows through the Lätäseno-Hietajoki wetland protection area. It is also part of the Poroeno-Lätäseno canoe route (which begins in the Käsivarsi Wilderness Area), and offers lean-to shelter and wilderness hut accommodation.

See also
List of rivers in Finland

Torne river basin
Rivers of Enontekiö
Rivers of Finland